The 2011–12 Dallas Stars season is the 45th season (44th of play) for the National Hockey League (NHL) franchise that was established on June 5, 1967, and 19th season (18th of play) since the franchise relocated to Dallas to start the 1993–94 season.

The team failed to qualify for the Stanley Cup playoffs for the fourth year in a row. This was the second consecutive season that the Stars finished with a winning record but did not qualify for the playoffs.

Off-Season
On June 17, 2011, the Stars officially announced the hiring of Glen Gulutzan to be their new head coach. Gulutzan had been the head coach of the Stars' American Hockey League affiliate, the Texas Stars.

Regular season
The Stars' power play struggled during the regular season, as they finished 30th overall in power-play goals scored (33) and in power-play percentage (13.52%).

Playoffs
The Stars failed to qualify for the 2012 Stanley Cup playoffs.

Standings

Schedule and results

Pre-season

Regular season

Player statistics

Skaters

Note: GP = Games played; G = Goals; A = Assists; Pts = Points; +/− = Plus/minus; PIM = Penalty minutes

Goaltenders
Note: GP = Games played; TOI = Time on ice (minutes); W = Wins; L = Losses; OT = Overtime losses; GA = Goals against; GAA= Goals against average; SA= Shots against; SV= Saves; Sv% = Save percentage; SO= Shutouts

†Denotes player spent time with another team before joining Stars. Stats reflect time spent with the Stars only.
‡Traded mid-season
Bold/italics denotes franchise record

Awards and records

Awards

Records

Milestones

Transactions 
The Stars have been involved in the following transactions during the 2011–12 season:

Trades

Free agents signed

Free agents lost

Claimed via waivers

Lost via waivers

Lost via retirement

Player signings

Draft picks 
The Stars' picks at the 2011 NHL Entry Draft in St. Paul, Minnesota.

See also 
 2011–12 NHL season

References

Dallas Stars seasons
D
D
Dallas Stars
Dallas Stars
2010s in Dallas